David Michael Langstone Bolt (Harrow, 30 November 192716 November 2012) was an English novelist and literary agent. He was educated at Dulwich College, served with 10th Gurkha Rifles and as superintendent in the Malayan Police, 1948-50.

Works
The Albatross, 1954
A Cry Ascending 1955
Adam 1960
The Man who Did 1963
Samson 1979
Gurkhas, non fiction 1967 
The Moon Princess, for children 1970
An Authors' Handbook, non-fiction
Of Heaven & Hope, religious 1965

References

1927 births
2012 deaths
English male novelists